John Libka (born June 13, 1987) is a Major League Baseball umpire.

Biography
Libka was born on June 13, 1987, in Saginaw, Michigan, to Gary and Lori Libka. He grew up in Mayville, Michigan, and attended high school at the Juniata Christian School in Vassar, Michigan. Libka played baseball through his junior year in high school before beginning to umpire through the Michigan High School Athletic Association's Legacy Program. Under the direction of his father, Gary, Libka officiated his first games at age 16. After high school, Libka attended Pensacola Christian College, graduating with a degree in education. After a teaching internship, Libka decided to return to umpiring, attending the Wendelstedt Umpire School and graduating in 2010. Libka now is an instructor at the Wendelstedt School.

Professional career
Libka made his Major League Baseball debut on May 27, 2017, umpiring a doubleheader in which the Detroit Tigers visited the Chicago White Sox. On July 6, 2017, he ejected his first player, sending the Houston Astros' Marwin González off the field for arguing balls and strikes. Through the 2018 regular season he was found to be the best performing home plate umpire in terms of accuracy in calling balls and strikes, with an error rate of 7.59 percent, and second best in 2018 alone, with an error rate of 7.33 percent. This was based on a study conducted at Boston University where 372,442 pitches were called and analyzed.  He was officially hired by MLB prior to the 2022 season.

References

1987 births
Living people
Major League Baseball umpires
Sportspeople from Michigan
People from Saginaw, Michigan
Pensacola Christian College alumni